This is a list of species in the darkling beetle genus Eleodes.

Eleodes species

 Eleodes aalbui Triplehorn, 2007
 Eleodes acuta (Say, 1824)
 Eleodes acutangula Blaisdell, 1921
 Eleodes acuticauda LeConte, 1851
 Eleodes adumbrata Blaisdell, 1925
 Eleodes aequalis (Say, 1835)
 Eleodes alticola Blaisdell, 1925
 Eleodes amaura Champion, 1892
 Eleodes anachronus Triplehorn, 201035
 Eleodes angulata (Eschscholtz, 1829)
 Eleodes angusta Eschscholtz, 1829
 Eleodes anthracina Blaisdell, 1909
 Eleodes arcuata Casey, 1884
 Eleodes aristata Somerby, 1977
 Eleodes armata LeConte, 1851 (armored stink beetle)
 Eleodes aspera LeConte, 1866
 Eleodes barbata Wickham, 1918
 Eleodes bidens Triplehorn, 2007
 Eleodes bishopensis Somerby & Doyen, 1976
 Eleodes blanchardii Blaisdell, 1909
 Eleodes blapoides Eschscholtz, 1829
 Eleodes brevicollis Gemminger, 1870
 Eleodes brucei Triplehorn, 2007
 Eleodes brunnipes Casey, 1890
 Eleodes calcarata Champion, 1884
 Eleodes californica Blaisdell, 1929
 Eleodes carbonaria (Say, 1824)
 Eleodes caseyi Blaisdell, 1909
 Eleodes caudifera LeConte, 1858
 Eleodes clavicornis Eschscholtz, 1829
 Eleodes coarctata Champion, 1885
 Eleodes composita Casey, 1891
 Eleodes connata Solier, 1848
 Eleodes consobrina LeConte, 1851
 Eleodes constricta LeConte, 1858
 Eleodes cooperi Somerby & Doyen, 1976
 Eleodes cordata Eschscholtz, 1829
 Eleodes corrugans Triplehorn, 2007
 Eleodes corvina Blaisdell, 1921
 Eleodes curta Champion, 1884
 Eleodes curvidens Triplehorn & Cifuentes-Ruiz, 2011
 Eleodes debilis LeC4onte, 1858
 Eleodes delicata Blaisdell, 1929
 Eleodes dentipes Eschscholtz, 1829 (dentate stink beetle)
 Eleodes dilaticollis Champion, 1884
 Eleodes discincta Blaisdell, 1925
 Eleodes dissimilis Blaisdell, 1909
 Eleodes distincta Solier, 1848
 Eleodes easterlai Triplehorn, 1975
 Eleodes ebenina (Solier, 1848)
 Eleodes elongatula Eschscholtz, 1829
 Eleodes erratica Champion, 1884
 Eleodes eschscholtzii Solier, 1848
 Eleodes exarata Champion, 1884
 Eleodes extricata (Say, 1824)
 Eleodes femorata LeConte, 1851
 Eleodes fiski Triplehorn, 2015
 Eleodes forreri Champion, 1884
 Eleodes fuchsii Blaisdell, 1909
 Eleodes fusiformis LeConte, 1858
 Eleodes gigantea Mannerheim, 1843
 Eleodes glabricollis Champion, 1884
 Eleodes goryi Solier, 1848
 Eleodes gracilis LeConte, 1858
 Eleodes grandicollis Mannerheim, 1843
 Eleodes granosa LeConte, 1866
 Eleodes granulata LeConte, 1857
 Eleodes gravida (Eschscholtz, 1829)
 Eleodes grutus Aalbu, Smith & Triplehorn, 201232
 Eleodes guadalupensis Aalbu, Smith & Triplehorn, 2012
 Eleodes halli Blaisdell, 1941
 Eleodes hepburni Champion, 1884
 Eleodes hirsuta LeConte, 1861
 Eleodes hirtipennis Triplehorn, 1964
 Eleodes hispilabris (Say, 1824)
 Eleodes hoegei Champion, 1885
 Eleodes hoppingii Blaisdell, 1909
 Eleodes hornii Blaisdell, 1909
 Eleodes humeralis LeConte, 1857
 Eleodes hybrida Blaisdell, 1917
 Eleodes impolita (Say, 1835)
 Eleodes inculta LeConte, 1861 (island darkling beetle)
 Eleodes innocens LeConte, 1866
 Eleodes inornata Johnston, 2016
 Eleodes insularis Linell, 1899
 Eleodes kaweana Blaisdell, 1933
 Eleodes knullorum Triplehorn, 1971
 Eleodes labialis Triplehorn, 1975
 Eleodes laevigata Solier, 1848
 Eleodes lariversi Somerby & Doyen, 1976
 Eleodes lecontei Horn, 1870
 Eleodes leechi Tanner, 1961
 Eleodes leptoscelis Triplehorn, 1975
 Eleodes letcheri Blaisdell, 1909
 Eleodes littoralis (Eschscholtz, 1829)
 Eleodes longicollis LeConte, 1851
 Eleodes longicornis Champion, 1884
 Eleodes longipilosa Horn, 1891
 Eleodes loretensis Blaisdell, 1923
 Eleodes madrensis Johnston, 2015
 Eleodes manni Blaisdell, 1917
 Eleodes marginata Eschscholtz, 1829
 Eleodes maura (Say, 1835)
 Eleodes melanaria Eschscholtz, 1829
 Eleodes mexicana Blaisdell, 1943
 Eleodes microps Aalbu, Smith & Triplehorn, 2012
 Eleodes mirabilis Triplehorn, 2007
 Eleodes moesta Blaisdell, 1921
 Eleodes montana Champion, 1884
 Eleodes muricatula Triplehorn, 2007
 Eleodes mutilata Blaisdell, 1921
 Eleodes nana Blaisdell, 1909
 Eleodes neomexicana Blaisdell, 1909
 Eleodes neotomae Blaisdell, 1909
 Eleodes nevadensis Blaisdell, 1909
 Eleodes nigrina LeConte, 1858
 Eleodes nigropilosa (LeConte, 1851)
 Eleodes novoverrucula Boddy, 1957
 Eleodes nunenmacheri Blaisdell, 1918
 Eleodes obliterata (Say, 1835)
 Eleodes obscura (Say, 1824)
 Eleodes olida Champion, 1892
 Eleodes opaca (Say, 1824) (plains false wireworm)
 Eleodes oregona Blaisdell, 1941
 Eleodes ornatipennis Blaisdell, 1937
 Eleodes orophila Somerby, 1977
 Eleodes osculans (LeConte, 1851) (wooly darkling beetle)
 Eleodes panamintensis Somerby, 1977
 Eleodes papillosa Blaisdell, 1917
 Eleodes parowana Blaisdell, 1925
 Eleodes parvicollis Eschscholtz, 1829
 Eleodes patulicollis Blaisdell, 1932
 Eleodes pedinoides LeConte, 1858
 Eleodes peropaca Champion, 1892
 Eleodes pilosa Horn, 1870
 Eleodes pimelioides Mannerheim, 1843
 Eleodes planata Eschscholtz, 1829
 Eleodes platypennis Triplehorn, 2007
 Eleodes polita Champion, 1892
 Eleodes ponderosa Champion, 1884
 Eleodes producta Mannerheim, 1843
 Eleodes propinqua Blaisdell, 1918
 Eleodes punctigera Blaisdell, 1935
 Eleodes quadricollis Eschscholtz, 1829
 Eleodes reddelli Triplehorn, 2007
 Eleodes rileyi Casey, 1891
 Eleodes robinetti Boddy, 1957
 Eleodes rossi Blaisdell, 1943
 Eleodes rotundicollis (Eschscholtz, 1829)
 Eleodes rotundipennis LeConte, 1857
 Eleodes rufipes Pierre, 1976
 Eleodes rugosa Perbosc, 1839
 Eleodes rugosifrons Triplehorn & Reddell, 1991
 Eleodes ruida (Say, 1835)
 Eleodes sallaei Champion, 1885
 Eleodes samalayucae Triplehorn, 2007
 Eleodes sanmartinensis Blaisdell, 1921
 Eleodes scabricula LeConte, 1858
 Eleodes scabripennis LeConte, 1859
 Eleodes scabriventris Blaisdell, 1933
 Eleodes scabrosa Eschscholtz, 1829
 Eleodes scapularis Champion, 1884
 Eleodes schlingeri Somerby & Doyen, 1976
 Eleodes schwarzii Blaisdell, 1909
 Eleodes scyroptera Triplehorn, 2007
 Eleodes segregata Champion, 1892
 Eleodes snowii Blaisdell, 1909
 Eleodes solieri Champion, 1885
 Eleodes spiculifera Triplehorn, 2007
 Eleodes spilmani Somerby & Doyen, 1976
 Eleodes spinipes Solier, 1848
 Eleodes spinolae Solier, 1848
 Eleodes spoliata Blaisdell, 1933
 Eleodes sponsa LeConte, 1858
 Eleodes sprousei Triplehorn & Reddell, 1991
 Eleodes stolida Champion, 1885
 Eleodes striata (Guérin-Méneville, 1834)
 Eleodes striolata LeConte, 1858
 Eleodes strumosa Blaisdell, 1932
 Eleodes subcylindrica Casey, 1890
 Eleodes subdeplanata (Blaisdell, 1943)
 Eleodes subnitens LeConte, 1851
 Eleodes subtuberculata Walker, 1866
 Eleodes subvestita (Blaisdell, 1939)
 Eleodes sulcata (Eschscholtz, 1829)
 Eleodes sulcatula Champion, 1884
 Eleodes suturalis (Say, 1824) (red-backed darkling beetle)
 Eleodes tenebricosa Gemminger, 1870
 Eleodes tenebrosa Horn, 1870
 Eleodes tenuipes Casey, 1890
 Eleodes tessellata Champion, 1892
 Eleodes thomasi Aalbu, Smith & Triplehorn, 2012
 Eleodes tibialis Blaisdell, 1909
 Eleodes tribulus Thomas, 2005
 Eleodes tricostata (Say, 1824)
 Eleodes triplehorni Somerby & Doyen, 1976
 Eleodes trita Blaisdell, 1917
 Eleodes tuberculata Eschscholtz, 1829
 Eleodes ursus Triplehorn, 1996
 Eleodes vanduzeei Blaisdell, 1923
 Eleodes versatilis Blaisdell, 1921
 Eleodes veterator Horn, 187433
 Eleodes volcanensis Somerby, 1977
 Eleodes wakelandi Somerby, 1977
 Eleodes watrousi Triplehorn, 2007
 Eleodes wenzeli Blaisdell, 1925
 Eleodes wheeleri Aalbu, Smith & Triplehorn, 2012
 Eleodes wynnei Aalbu, Smith & Triplehorn, 2012

References

Eliodes
Eliodes, List